The 2003–04 Nemzeti Bajnokság I, also known as NB I, was the 102nd season of top-tier football in Hungary. The league was officially named Arany Ászok Liga for sponsoring reasons. The season started on 25 July 2003 and ended on 27 May 2004.

Overview
It was contested by 12 teams, and Ferencvárosi TC won the championship.

First stage

League standings

Results

Second stage

Championship playoff

League standings

Results

Relegation playoff

League standings

Results

Statistical leaders

Top goalscorers

References
Hungary - List of final tables (RSSSF)

Nemzeti Bajnokság I seasons
1
Hungary